The Leopard is a novel by Giuseppe Tomasi di Lampedusa that chronicles the changes in Sicilian life and society during the Risorgimento. Published posthumously in 1958 by Feltrinelli, after two rejections by the leading Italian publishing houses Mondadori and Einaudi, it became the top-selling novel in Italian history and is considered one of the most important novels in modern Italian literature. In 1959, it won Italy's highest award for fiction, the Strega Prize. In 2012, The Observer named it as one of "the 10 best historical novels". The novel was also made into an award-winning 1963 film of the same name, directed by Luchino Visconti and starring Burt Lancaster, Claudia Cardinale and Alain Delon.

Tomasi was the last in a line of minor princes in Sicily. He had long contemplated writing a historical novel based on his great-grandfather, Don Giulio Fabrizio Tomasi, another Prince of Lampedusa. But after the Lampedusa palace near Palermo was bombed and pillaged during the Allied invasion of Sicily, Tomasi sank into a lengthy depression. To combat his feelings he  began to write Il Gattopardo.

Despite being universally known in English as The Leopard, the original Italian title is Il Gattopardo which refers to the serval, a much smaller animal. Although uncommon north of the Sahara Desert, one of the serval's few North African ranges is quite near Lampedusa. The symbol on the Tomasi di Lampedusa coat of arms is the serval, and though unusual, servals were owned by some Sicilians as exotic pets.

Themes and interpretation 

The novel is the story of Don Fabrizio Corbera, Prince of Salina, a 19th-century Sicilian nobleman caught in the midst of civil war and revolution. As a result of political upheaval, the prince's position in the island's class system is eroded by newly-moneyed peasants and "shabby minor gentry." As the novel progresses, the Prince is forced to choose between upholding the continuity of upper class values, and breaking tradition to secure the continuity of his family's influence. A central theme of the story is the struggle between mortality and decay (death, fading of beauty, fading of memories, change of political system, false relics, etc.), and abstraction and eternity (the prince's love for the stars, continuity and the resilience of the Sicilian people). In a letter to a friend, the author notes: "Be careful: the dog Bendicò is a very important character and is almost the key to the novel". This heraldic emblem is the key to destruction, in the sense that ruin comes even to the dog.

Overview 

Most of the novel is set during the time of the Risorgimento, specifically during the period when Giuseppe Garibaldi, the leader of the famous Redshirts, swept through Sicily with his proletariat army known as The Thousand. As the novel opens in May 1860, Garibaldi's Redshirts have landed on the Sicilian coast and are pressing inland; they will soon overthrow the Kingdom of the Two Sicilies and incorporate it into the unified Italian Kingdom under Victor Emmanuel. The plot focuses upon the aristocratic Salina family, which is headed by Prince Fabrizio. Don Fabrizio is the patriarch of the family as well as the keeper of its strict code of conduct and Roman Catholic ritual.
 
Prince Fabrizio finds marriage with his overly puritanical wife to be physically unsatisfying, and thus keeps a series of mistresses and courtesans as well as indulging in his hobby of amateur astronomy. He is drawn to his nephew Prince Tancredi Falconeri whom he sees as having noble qualities. This affection is somewhat diminished when he discovers that Tancredi has joined Garibaldi's Redshirts. On a trip to the Salina estate in the town of Donnafugata the Prince learns that the mayor, Don Calogero Sedara, has become wealthy through dodgy business transactions and political influence and that his wealth now rivals that of the Salinas. When Sedara introduces his extraordinarily beautiful daughter, Angelica, Tancredi is smitten with her, to the dismay of the Prince's daughter Concetta, who loves Tancredi. Although aware of his daughter's feelings, the Prince accepts the inevitable and helps arrange Tancredi's betrothal to Angelica. The two pass a blissfully innocent period of engagement.   

Fabrizio is offered the position of a Senator in the new Italian state but turns it down. Angelica is introduced to Palermo society at a sumptuous ball and despite her background slips easily into the role of future countess.  The narrative then jumps forward by two decades and finds Prince Fabrizio on his deathbed, surrounded by family. The Prince considers that he will be the last true prince of the Salinas, the last leopard. A final chapter takes place in 1910 when Concetta, now seventy, is living in the family home with two of her sisters.

Plot summary

Introduction to the Prince, May 1860 

This chapter begins with a detailed description of the exquisitely decorated drawing-room where the Salina family recites the daily rosary. Afterwards, the Prince wanders out into the garden, where the sickly, over-ripe smells of lush foliage threaten to overwhelm him with memories – specifically of a mortally wounded Neapolitan soldier who in his last moments had crawled into the lemon grove and died there. Perturbed by these thoughts, the Prince takes refuge in watching his dog, Bendicò, joyfully dig up the garden, and in thoughts about the behavior of his wayward nephew, Prince Tancredi Falconeri.

At dinner the Prince announces that he will drive into Palermo. The adults at the table, including the Princess and the family's Jesuit chaplain, Father Pirrone, instantly know that the only reason he is leaving is to visit a brothel. As the Prince is driven in his carriage into the city he passes Tancredi's villa, worrying again that Tancredi has fallen in with the bad company of the rebels fighting to overthrow the Kingdom of the Two Sicilies. The Prince's thoughts vacillate between anticipation and guilt, between disgust with his wife (who crosses herself whenever they make love or he even kisses her goodnight; to preempt a private rebuke from the family priest about visiting prostitutes, the Prince points out that "he's had seven children with the Princess and yet has never seen her navel") and admiration for her modesty. Two hours later his thoughts run a similar course, with the addition of a kind of disgusted satisfaction with the prostitute and a satisfied disgust with his own body. When he arrives back home he finds the Princess in bed, thinks affectionately of her, climbs into bed with her and finds he cannot sleep. "Towards dawn, however, the Princess had occasion to make the Sign of the Cross."

The following morning the Prince's shaving is interrupted by the arrival of Tancredi, who reveals that his position in the Italian nationalist movement has risen. He adds that he will soon be joining Garibaldi in the mountains. The Prince suddenly imagines his beloved nephew dead in the garden with his guts trailing out like the Crown soldier and tries to dissuade him from departing. However Tancredi insists that he is fighting for a very good reason. Later, as the Prince gets dressed, he realizes the practicality of Tancredi's words. As he ponders the coming upheavals, he realizes that his nephew is more aristocratically minded than he had thought.

After breakfast the Prince, accompanied by the playful Bendicò, goes into his office, which is lined with century-old paintings of the Salinas' estates. As he sits at his cluttered desk the Prince recalls how much he dislikes both the room and the work it represents. This dislike intensifies during visits from his accountant and one of his tenants, both of whom are allied with the Redshirts. Both of them assure the Prince that the unification of Italy will be peaceful and will benefit everyone, including the nobility. The Prince allows himself to be reassured, certain that the class system will remain unchanged no matter what. This belief is reinforced by his visit to Father Pirrone atop a tower where the men practise their joint hobby of astronomy.

At lunch the Prince becomes aware that his family is worried about Tancredi’s safety. As a result the Prince makes an effort to appear simultaneously concerned and reassuring. When dessert is brought out it is his favorite – a large, castle-shaped rum jelly. The castle is essentially demolished before Don Paolo, the Prince's son and heir, gets a chance to have any.

That evening the Prince receives a letter urging him to flee to safety from the revolution. In response he simply laughs. Later, as the Salinas gather to say their rosary, the Prince reads in a newspaper of the approach of Garibaldi and his men. He is disturbed but reassures himself that Garibaldi will be reined in by his Piedmontese masters.

Donnafugata, August 1860 

After a long journey by coach, the Prince, his faithful dog Bendicò and the squabbling Salinas arrive at their estate at Donnafugata. Both the officials of the town and the common people greet the Salinas as gladly as always. Their numbers include the new mayor, Don Calogero Sedàra.

The Prince reflects on Garibaldi's recent conquest of the island. The Expedition of the Thousand landed at Marsala, where Tancredi and other native Sicilians joined them. Garibaldi's march was finally completed with the Siege of Gaeta, where the final Bourbons were expelled and Garibaldi announced his dictatorship in the name of Victor Emmanuel II of the Kingdom of Sardinia. Upon his arrival, the citizens of Palermo rejoiced and, later, local leaders of the movement had called at the Salina palace. Although they treated the Prince with great respect, one of them insisted on flirting with his daughter Concetta.

After Mass, the Princess invites the officials to the traditional first-night dinner, and Don Calogero requests permission to bring his daughter Angelica.
 
As the Prince inspects his property and possessions, the manager lists everything that has been done to keep the estate in order and then passes on some local news. Don Calogero, who was active in Garibaldi's invasion, has become a wealthy landowner and businessman. To the dismay of the Prince, Don Calogero is now almost as wealthy as the Salinas. The manager adds that Angelica has become quite full of herself as a result. The Prince realizes that he is somewhat resentful of Don Calogero's status.

The Prince's bath before dinner is interrupted by the arrival of Father Pirrone. Concetta has asked Father Pirrone to tell her father that she is in love with Tancredi and that she believes a marriage proposal to be imminent. She desires instruction from her father as to how she is to respond. The Prince ponders his fondness for Concetta, which is based in her apparent submissiveness and placidity. However, he thinks that Tancredi's political ambitions may require more money than Concetta will bring as her dowry. Keeping his thoughts to himself, the Prince decrees that Father Pirrone is to tell Concetta that the Prince will discuss it with her later.

After a nap, the Prince goes out into the garden, where his contemplations of an erotic statue are interrupted by Tancredi's teasing about sex, comments which also apply to a small crop of beautifully ripe peaches in a nearby grove. The Prince uneasily changes the subject, and he and Tancredi gossip their way back to the house, where they join the rest of the family and the arriving dinner guests.

Soon after, Don Calogero arrives, and the Prince is relieved to see that he is dressed quite tastelessly. His relief ends abruptly when Angelica arrives — he finds her attractive enough to feel the stir of lust. At dinner, Angelica flirts openly with Tancredi — who, in his turn, finds himself attracted to both Angelica's beauty and her money. He tells Angelica a risqué story about storming a convent and jokes about how if she had been present his band of comrades would not have needed the nuns. Concetta is enraged, angrily rebukes Tancredi and turns her back to him.

The following day the Prince and his family uphold a centuries-old family tradition and visit a convent founded by a female ancestor. Although tradition demands that he hold back, Tancredi expresses a desire to enter the convent, saying that a new interpretation of the rules will allow him to. To the shock of both Tancredi and her father, Concetta snaps that Tancredi has already been in a convent and enters without him.

After returning from the convent, the Prince looks out from his window at the town square of Donnafugata and spies Tancredi, dressed in his 'seduction color' of Prussian blue. He is carrying a box of peaches from the palace's fruit grove and is seen knocking on the door of the Sedàra household.

"The Troubles of Don Fabrizio." October 1860 

This chapter begins with a lyrically written introduction to the silent, still, dim, early morning world at Donnafugata in which the Prince likes to walk with Bendicò. Narration then describes how Tancredi writes every week, but never to Concetta and always with comments that he would like the Prince to pass on to Angelica, who, in turn, visits every day, pretending to come to see the girls but in reality to learn news of Tancredi.

One particular day a letter arrives from Tancredi in which he asks the Prince to ask Angelica's father for her hand in marriage. He uses several arguments to persuade the Prince to do so, among them that she will bring money into the family and guarantee that the family will continue to have status in the new kingdom of Italy. The Prince finds himself agreeing with many of Tancredi's points and takes a little second-hand sensual pleasure in knowing that he will soon be able to enjoy seeing Angelica more often.

When the Prince informs the Princess she is outraged and accuses Tancredi of betraying both Concetta and his lawful King. The Prince angrily replies that if Concetta wished to marry Tancredi then she should not have refused him outside the convent. The Princess relaxes.

The next morning, the Prince, in the company of his usual morning companions, Don Ciccio (the parish organist) and Bendicò, takes his gun with him on his walk and shoots a rabbit: 'The animal had died tortured by anxious hopes of salvation, imagining it could still escape when it was already caught, just like so many human beings.'

Later, the Prince and Ciccio eat their picnic lunch and settle down for a nap. However, instead of sleeping, the Prince finds himself contemplating the recent vote taken on the question of whether Sicily should politically join with the new Italian Kingdom. The Prince remembers how he could not decide which way to mark his ballot. Eventually he voted 'yes'. He then recalls the celebrations which greeted the result — a unanimous vote in favor.

The Prince contemplates what he believes to be the historical significance of the vote, as well as its deeper meaning. This leads him to ask Ciccio how he voted in the Plebiscite. At first reluctant, Don Ciccio finally admits that, as the son of a Bourbon royal gamekeeper, he could not bring himself to vote in favor of the revolution. Many others in Donnafugata voted the same way, but Don Calogero rigged the election and announced the results as unanimous in favor of the House of Savoy.

The Prince asks Don Ciccio what the people of Donnafugata really think of Don Calogero. Don Ciccio speaks at angry length of how many people despise Don Calogero in spite of, or perhaps because of, his embodiment of a harsh reality — that 'every coin spent in the world must end in someone's pocket.' Don Calogero was moneylender to peasants and eloped with Angelica's mother, who was the uneducated daughter of a rough peasant farmer.  The girl's father vowed revenge, but his corpse was later found, shot twelve times in the back.  Angelica's mother never appears in public, and the rumor is that, because of her peasant background, she is unable to function in society.  Don Ciccio reveals that he once glimpsed Angelica's mother at early-morning mass and discovered that she, like Angelica, is an extraordinary beauty. It is thus no surprise that the homely Don Calogero keeps such a woman under wraps.   

Although scandalized by Don Ciccio's stories, the Prince at last asks the question that is really on his mind — what is Angelica truly like? Don Ciccio speaks rapturously of her beauty, poise and sophistication, and then speaks about how her parents' vulgarity seems not to have affected her. The Prince bristles and informs Don Ciccio that thenceforth, because Angelica and Tancredi are to be married, the Sedàras must be spoken about with appropriate respect. Don Ciccio, who has believed that Tancredi was attempting to seduce Angelica and ruin her marriage prospects, in order to embarrass her father, is horrified. He bursts out that for Tancredi and Angelica to marry will cause the end of the good qualities of the Salina and Falconeri families. However, the Prince thinks to himself that the marriage will be not the end, but the beginning. As the Prince and Don Ciccio return to Donnafugata, it is impossible to tell which of them is Don Quixote and which is Sancho Panza.

The Prince takes his time dressing for his meeting with Don Calogero and when he finally goes downstairs he has a vision of the two of them as animals. Their conversation is for the most part polite, with both men making occasional slips into tactlessness but ultimately making the truths of the situation quite apparent. For the Prince the truth involves Tancredi's excellent lineage but extreme poverty, whereas for Don Calogero the truth involves his wealth, which is much greater than the Prince had ever realized, and the fact that Don Calogero is in final negotiations to purchase the title of Baroness for his daughter. An agreement is reached that the marriage is to proceed. As the Prince leaves the meeting he passes Concetta, who does not even turn.

"Love at Donnafugata." November 1860 

As preparations progressed for the wedding between Tancredi and Angelica, the Prince and Don Calogero became more like each other — the Prince grew more ruthless in his business dealings, while Don Calogero saw the value of good manners and better grooming. Don Calogero, the narrator suggests, began 'that process of continual refining which in the course of three generations transforms innocent peasants into defenseless gentry'.

The narrator describes, in a tone that is at times enraptured and at other times pointedly cynical, Angelica's first visit to the Prince and his family, following her betrothal to Tancredi. Dressed beautifully, she makes her entrance with perfect timing and immediately endears herself to the Prince. Only Bendicò, growling in a corner, seems unhappy to see her. Finally, the narrator also describes how Angelica, as she listens, coolly considers the financial and sexual prosperity that awaits them, and comments that, within a few years of the marriage, Angelica will become one of the great political kingmakers of the Italian Kingdom.

A week later, the family's quiet evening is interrupted by the unexpected arrival of Tancredi, who has brought with him a friend, Count Carlo. Tancredi and the Count, in their full dress uniforms, fascinate the Prince's daughters and puzzle the Prince, who says he had thought they were still fighting for Garibaldi. Tancredi and the Count react with disgust, saying there was no way they could have stayed with such a rough outfit when positions with the new king's army were available. Tancredi then produces the ring he has purchased for Angelica. A moment later, Angelica rushes in, having been informed by a note that Tancredi is back. The lovers embrace; sensuality fills the air.

Love and sensuality fill the subsequent days at Donnafugata. The Count pursues Concetta, dreamily and ineffectually, while Concetta's younger sisters, Carolina and Caterina, dream romantically of Tancredi and the Count. Tancredi and Angelica spend their time exploring the palace's many rooms, each of which contains some representation of a leopard, the family insignia. They discover one set of rooms that seems to have been used to indulge sexual sadism, and flee when the implications sink in.  Narration describes how, on several occasions, Tancredi and Angelica are tempted to give in to their mutual sensual desire, but never do, and how this idyllic time of romantic, intimate gaming between them is a happy prelude to the miserable, unsuccessful marriage that will follow.

A government representative, Chevalley di Monterzuolo, arrives and tells the Prince that, because of his aristocratic background and social influence, the government wants him to sit as an appointed (as opposed to elected) member of the Senate. At first, the Prince is quite silent, leading Chevalley to attempt to flatter him into accepting the offer — an attempt that does not work. The Prince explains at increasingly intense, often poetic length, why, like other Sicilians, he has no interest in being involved in government.  He suggests that Don Calogero is more the type of man they should be looking for, and the narrator informs us that Don Calogero will indeed became a Senator ten years hence.    

The following morning, the Prince accompanies Chevalley to the station. As they walk through the streets of early-morning Donnafugata, both of them overwhelmed by the squalor and despair surrounding them, they think the situation ought to change, but whereas Chevalley believes it will, the Prince is convinced it will not.

"Father Pirrone Pays a Visit." February 1861 

Father Pirrone visits his home village. Much has changed since the arrival of the Garibaldini. The land, which was previously owned by a Benedictine monastery, has been seized and sold to a peasant moneylender. Many of the villagers complain to Father Pirrone about their new landlord.

During a conversation with a childhood friend, Father Pirrone enters a lengthy speech explaining why the Prince and other aristocrats do not really have any reaction one way or the other to the events of the revolution. They "live in a world of their own...all they live by has been handled by others." He concludes by saying that the feelings and attitudes that give rise to class consciousness, never truly die.

The next day, Pirrone finds his sister Sarina in tears in the kitchen, and gets her to admit that her daughter Angelina (whom Pirrone mentally compares to the beautiful Angelica, and finds wanting) is pregnant out of wedlock. She confesses furiously that the father is the girl's first cousin Santino, the son of paternal uncle of Sarina and Father Pirrone. The latter ponders the long-standing family feud between Pirrone's father and his uncle. After saying Mass, he goes to visit his uncle and manipulates him and Santino into accepting what he proposes as the terms of marriage. Back home, Father Pirrone persuades Angelina's grudging father into agreeing to the terms of marriage by sacrificing his own inheritance. Santino and his father arrive; the marriage is contracted and the young people are happy. Later, while travelling back to the Salinas' Palace, Father Pirrone is certain that Santino and his father had planned Angelina's seduction so they could get their hands on property they had believed was rightfully theirs. He also realizes that the nobility and the peasants are, at least on one level, far more similar than he once thought.

"A Ball." November 1862 
The Salinas prepare to attend a ball, one of the most important of the Palermo social season. The Prince is both excited and concerned about the evening to come. It will be the first time Angelica and her beauty are to be presented to the public. However, he remains concerned that Don Calogero will make a complete fool of both himself and the Salinas. When Angelica, looking beautiful, and Don Calogero, looking acceptable, arrive shortly after, Angelica makes a huge social success, thanks to detailed training in etiquette given to her by Tancredi. The Prince, after being satisfied that Angelica has been accepted, wanders through the rooms of the Palazzo Ponteleone where the ball is being held, becoming increasingly gloomy at the callowness of the young men, the boredom in the older men, and the silliness of the girls. The Prince notices Tancredi and Angelica dancing happily together, oblivious to the other's desperation, ambition and greed. As he watches, the Prince comes to realize and accept, if only for a moment, that whatever happiness the lovers feel is to be celebrated, no matter what.

Angelica asks the Prince to dance with her. Flattered, he agrees to a waltz. They are a successful couple and dance well, with the Prince's memory flashing back to the days of his youth "when, in that very same ballroom, he had danced with the Princess before he knew disappointment, boredom and the rest". As the dance finishes, he realizes the other dancers have stopped and are watching them, his "leonine air" preventing the onlookers from bursting into applause. Angelica asks him to eat with her and Tancredi, and for a flattered moment he almost says yes, but then again remembers his youth and, recalling how embarrassing it would have been for him to have an old relative eating with him and a lover, politely excuses himself. The ball goes on until six in the morning. The Prince decides to walk home, alone with his thoughts.

"Death of a Prince." July 1883 
For years, the Prince has felt that he is dying, 'as if the vital fluid...life itself in fact and perhaps even the will to go on living, were ebbing out of him... as grains of sand cluster and then line up one by one, unhurried, unceasing, before the narrow neck of an hourglass'. A last-minute visit to a doctor has tired him so much that it is decided that he should not go back to the villa outside Palermo, but shall stay in a hotel inside the city itself. As he settles into the hotel, the Prince contemplates the fates of several of his family members — Tancredi's political success in the new Kingdom of Italy; and the deaths of Father Pirrone from old age, of Princess Maria from diabetes, and of Paolo after being thrown by a horse. He also recalls the maturation and dignity of Concetta who, he realizes, is the true heir of what was noble and enduring of the Salina family. He dismisses Paolo's son and biological heir, Fabrizietto, as dissolute, shallow and aimless.

As the Prince receives the Sacrament of Extreme Unction, he considers the joys (sensual, spiritual, political and animal — in particular, the loving and playful Bendicò) and the sorrows (political, sexual and familial) that he has experienced, concluding that of the 73 years he has been alive, he has only fully lived three of them. In his last moments, as his family gathers around, he sees a young woman appear — beautiful, exquisitely dressed, sensitive, and smiling lovingly. The narrator describes her in terms identical to those in which it describes a beautiful woman glimpsed at the train station on the way back to Palermo — in other words, death was present in his life even then. As the woman helps him to his feet, he sees her face, and to him she appears 'lovelier than she ever had when glimpsed in stellar space'.

"Relics." May 1910 
This chapter begins with a reference to 'the old Salina ladies', three elderly sisters whose right to have private Masses in their home is being investigated by representatives of the Archdiocese of Palermo, due to the fact that the ladies have certain relics in their home that, according to rumor, may not be authentic. Eventually, the narrator reveals that the ladies are the three daughters of the Prince — the authoritarian Concetta, the blunt-spoken Carolina and the paralyzed Caterina. As the priests enter the chapel, they are surprised to see a sensuously painted 'Madonna' hanging behind the altar, and walls lined with relics.

After the priests depart, Concetta retires to her bedroom, where she keeps several locked boxes of decaying mementos of her past, including the skin of her father's dog Bendicò, which had been made into a rug and which is now completely moth-eaten. There, because she is the most pragmatic of the three sisters, she foresees what is about to happen — the confiscation of the relics and the painting, the re-consecration of the chapel, the inevitable spreading of stories of the Salinas' humiliation, and the equally inevitable destruction of what is left of the family's reputation and prestige. Her thoughts are interrupted by a footman announcing the arrival of Princess Angelica Falconeri.

The well-preserved Angelica, widowed after Tancredi's death a few years before, meets Concetta in the sitting room. She chattily tells Concetta of her plans for celebrating the fiftieth anniversary of the Garibaldi invasion. Angelica also promises to use her influence with the Cardinal to keep the family's embarrassment from going public. In addition, Angelica informs Concetta that an old friend is coming to call. Senator Tassoni is a veteran of Garibaldi's Redshirts, a close friend and confidant of Tancredi, and a former illicit lover of Angelica. Tassoni is shown in, and after speaking flatteringly of how well Tancredi had spoken of her, he confesses to Concetta that one night, Tancredi tearfully confessed to him that he had once told a lie to her, namely the story about the Redshirts' raid on a convent. Tassoni reveals that Tancredi had wanted to kiss Concetta when she reacted so angrily to the story, and had carried with him the grief of offending her for the rest his life.

After Tassoni and Angelica depart, a horrified Concetta sees Tancredi in a radically different light. What she had once believed was an attempt to seduce Angelica was only a momentary flirtation. Tancredi loved only her and was profoundly unhappy with the adulterous Angelica. Concetta also realizes that Tancredi's attempt to enter the convent with her family was a marriage proposal and that her angry words were interpreted as a refusal. After fifty years, Concetta is stripped of the comfort of blaming others for her broken heart.

The following day, the Cardinal inspects the palace chapel and orders the sisters to replace the painting behind the altar, stating that it does not depict the Blessed Virgin but a woman reading a letter from her lover. He leaves behind a priestly antiquarian to examine the relics and determine which are genuine. A few hours later, the priest emerges with a basket full of forged relics and the news that only the few which remain are genuine.

Meanwhile, Concetta returns to her room and contemplates her possessions there with new perspective. Even the few relics which she once cherished are now only reminders of a life unfulfilled. She also realizes that an unpleasant smell is coming from what remains of Bendicò's rug and orders it thrown out: 'During the flight from the window, its form recomposed itself for an instant; in the air there seemed to be dancing a quadruped with long whiskers, its right foreleg raised in imprecation. Then all found peace in a heap of livid dust.'

Locations 

 Sicily
 The Kingdom of Sardinia
 The Kingdom of the Two Sicilies (Map)
 Kingdom of Italy (1861–1946)
 Salina — the fictional Corbèra palatial estate in San Lorenzo, about five miles north of the center of Palermo.
 Donnafugata — the fictional name for the town Santa Margherita di Belice (near Palma di Montechiaro) and the Palazzo Filangeri-Cutò. Both the palace and adjacent Mother Church were destroyed by an earthquake in 1968.

Historical characters 
 Giuseppe Garibaldi (1807−1882), the military leader of the Expedition of the Thousand (11 May to 1 October 1860) from Marsala in Sicily to northern Lazio (Campania)
 Ferdinand II, a Bourbon King of The Two Sicilies. Reigned from 8 November 1830 to 22 May 1859. Died shortly before the narration of The Leopard begins. The Bourbons ruled the kingdom from Naples and lived in the Caserta Palace.
 Francis II, the last Bourbon King of the Two Sicilies. Reigned from 22 May 1859 to 20 March 1861.
 Victor Emmanuel II, Savoy King of Sardinia from 23 March 1849 to 17 March 1861, and King of Italy from 17 March 1861 to 9 January 1878. Resident at the Royal Palace of Turin.

Fictional characters 

The Corbera Family:
 Fabrizio Corbera, Prince of Salina — born 1810
 Maria Stella, Princess of Salina
 Carolina — eldest of seven children — born 1840
 Francesco Paolo — eldest son and heir — born 1844
 Concetta — second daughter — born 1848
 Tancredi Falconeri — orphan son of the prince's sister — born 1834
 Bendicò — the family dog

Others at Salina:
 Father Pirrone — Jesuit family priest — helps the prince with mathematical computations
 Pietro Russo — steward
 Ciccio Ferrara — accountant
 Mademoiselle Dombreuil — governess

Characters at Donnafugata:
 Calogero Sedàra — Mayor of Donnafugata
 Angelica — Calogero's daughter — born 1844
 Monsignor Trotolino — priest at Holy Mother Church
 Ciccio Genestra — notary
 Onofrio Rotolo — steward
 Toto Giambono — doctor
 Ciccio Tumeo — organist at Holy Mother Church — hunting partner of the prince
 Count Carlo Cavriaghi — friend of Tancredi from Lombardy
 Knight Aimone Chevalley di Monterzuolo — bureaucrat from Piedmont

Reception 

The novel was assailed from all sides upon its publication. Even the first attempt at its publishing failed when Lampedusa was told by an Italian editor that "his novel is unpublishable." When it was finally posthumously published in 1958, conservative elements criticized its portrayal of the decadence of both the nobility and clergy. Leftist elements attacked the novel for its criticism of Italian unification and the destruction of the nobility. The novel's decidedly non-Marxist depiction of the Sicilian working class also enraged the influential Communist Party of Italy.

Despite or because of this controversy, The Leopard was to gain great critical acclaim, most famously from the English novelist E.M. Forster, but also by many 20th and 21st century critics worldwide. In 1959, it won Italy's highest award for fiction, the Strega Prize.

Adaptations 

The novel served as the basis for a film directed by Luchino Visconti. Starring Burt Lancaster, Visconti's film has been described as a fresco of Sicilian life because of its opulent recreation of life. The saturated colours, cinematography, and Visconti's renowned attention to detail all helped make it the winner of the Palme d'Or at the Cannes Film Festival.

20th Century Fox cut the film dramatically for its original 1963 release, but in the 1980s Visconti's vision was re-released with English subtitles and the famous ballroom scene restored to its full 45 minute running time.

The novel was adapted for radio by Michael Hastings and Promenade Productions and broadcast on BBC Radio 3 in 2008. The radio play starred then-relative unknowns Tom Hiddleston and Hayley Atwell alongside respected actors such as Stanley Townsend and Julie Legrand.

Quotation 

"If we want everything to stay as it is, everything has to change." (spoken by Tancredi)

"We were the Leopards, the Lions, those who'll take our place will be little jackals, hyenas; and the whole lot of us, Leopards, jackals, and sheep, we'll all go on thinking ourselves the salt of the earth." (spoken by Don Fabrizio)

Current editions 

 An edition of Il gattopardo following the manuscript of 1957 is published by
 Milano : Feltrinelli Editore, Universale Economica 
 Archibald Colquhoun's English translation, The Leopard, originally published in 1960 by Collins (in the UK) and Pantheon Books (in the US) is available from
 London : The Harvill Press, Panther 
 London : David Campbell, Everyman's Library 
 New York: Pantheon Books 
 New York: Pantheon Books (Paperback)

References

External links 
  Il Gattopardo - Audiobook on archive.org.
 Il romanzo e il film: somiglianze e differenze "The Novel and the Film: resemblances and differences". In Italian. Accessed 15 October 2006.
 Donnafugata: The Leopard places in Palma di Montechiaro
 Donnafugata: The Leopard places in Santa Margherita Belice
 Vanity Fair article on recent restoration
 Personal tours of Lampedusa sites in Palermo and Sicily

1958 novels
Fiction set in 1860
Fiction set in 1861
Fiction set in 1862
Fiction set in 1883
Fiction set in 1910
Novels set in the 1860s
Novels set in the 1880s
Novels set in the 1910s
Italian historical novels
Italian novels adapted into films
Novels published posthumously
Novels set in Sicily
20th-century Italian novels
Strega Prize-winning works
Italian unification
Giuseppe Tomasi di Lampedusa